Paula Dalla Corte (born May, 2001) is a Swiss singer. She is known for winning the tenth season of The Voice of Germany  broadcast by the German television channels ProSieben and Sat.1 in 2020.

Life and career

Performances on The Voice of Germany 2020

Discography

Single
 "Someone Better" (2020)

References

External links

2001 births
21st-century Swiss women singers
Living people
The Voice (franchise) winners
Winner10